Shrine of New Generation Slaves is the fifth studio album by Polish progressive rock band Riverside. The album was released on 18 January 2013 in Poland, 21 January in the rest of Europe and 5 February in the USA. It is available in four different formats: digital, 1CD jewelcase, 2CDs mediabook, and 2LP vinyl. The latter two contain two bonus tracks. The author of the art booklets is, as is the case with all the previous albums, Travis Smith. The first single, "Celebrity Touch", was released on 17 December 2012 and a videoclip for the song, directed by Mateusz Winkiel, was released on 14 January 2013.

Track listing

Personnel
Riverside
 Mariusz Duda – vocals, bass, acoustic guitar, ukulele
Piotr Grudziński – guitar
 Michał Łapaj – keyboards and Hammond organ
 Piotr Kozieradzki – drums

Guest Personnel
 Marcin Odyniec - Soprano sax on 'Deprived' and alto sax on 'Night Session - Part Two'

Charts

References

2013 albums
Riverside (band) albums
Inside Out Music albums
Mystic Production albums